Aliotti is an Italian surname. Notable people with the surname include:

Bonaventura Aliotti (1640–1690), Italian Franciscan friar, organist and composer
Gina Aliotti (born 1984), American figure competitor
Nick Aliotti (born 1954), American football coach
Pietro Giovanni Aliotti (died 1563), Italian Roman Catholic bishop

See also
Aliotta

Italian-language surnames